Walling Pond is a privately owned pond that is open to the public for fishing.  The pond, located in Salem, Oregon, is owned by the Walling family.  The pond is located at the original site of their sand and gravel processing plant at the northeast corner of McGilchrist and 16th Streets, S.E.  The pond is popular with bait anglers and produces stocked rainbow trout.

See also 
 List of lakes in Oregon

References

External links
 2008 Oregon Department of Fish & Wildlife Stocking Schedule

Lakes of Oregon
Geography of Salem, Oregon
Lakes of Marion County, Oregon
Tourist attractions in Salem, Oregon